Andy Villalona better known as Andy Andy (born Angel Villalona in Azua de Compostela) is a Dominican musician from the famed Villalona family. He first started as a merenguero. He struggled with this type of music and the multinational record label Sony decided to cross over to bachata.

Career
Andy Andy is one of the most successful Dominican artists in the world, having sold over one million records in the United States to date, and held the Number 1 sales position for more than 39 consecutive weeks. He is the first Dominican artist in Latin music history to win three Billboard Awards in a single night. Multiple nominations: Latin Grammys, 7 nominations to Premio Lo Nuestro, Premios Casandra winner and others. He has also occupied multiple Top spots on a variety of important radio charts and other preferred media showcases in the country.

He is the Music Producer of all his seven Bachata albums (Andy Andy en Bachata, Aquí Conmigo, Necesito Un Amor, Ironia, Tú Me Haces Falta, Mi Música... Dos Tiempos, Placer y Castigo).
Creator of sound of Bachata with Accordion.
Andy Andy has realized duets with important Latin international singers such as Tito "El Bambino", Milly Quezada, Angel y Khriz, Fernando Villalona, Luis Segura, LDA, Alex Matos, Bimbo and others.

His first music album, Aquí Conmigo ("Here With Me"), was released in 2002. His second album, Necesito Un Amor ("I Need A Love"), was released in 2003 with the hits Voy A Tener Que Olividarte and Necesito Un Amor. His next album, Ironia ("Irony"), was released in 2005. His hit, Que Ironia, came in three forms: bachata, reggaeton, and ballad|balada, and his second hit, A Quien Le Importa, was featured in bachata and balada.

Andy Andy has been popularly recognized for his music and his commitment to the Hispanic community. In 2002, Andy's debut album, Aqui Conmigo was nominated as best "New Artist Tropical Salsa Air Play Track of the Year" at the Billboard Awards. In that same year he won three Estrella Awards, and a Quisqueya Award. In 2003, Andy's second album, Necesito un Amor, was nominated for a Latin Grammy for "Best Contemporary Tropical Album of the Year".  Also, he was nominated as "Tropical Traditional Artist of the Year" for Lo Nuestro Awards. Governor of New York honored him with a proclamation for his arduous work and development as an example for the Latin American youth; and the Governor of the State of Connecticut proclaimed April 17 as "Andy Andy Day" in honor of his successful career.

2005, Winner in Dominican Republic of the Casadra Awards as "Best Video" with "Que Ironia".
2006, First Dominican Artist who wins 3 Latin Billboard Awards in one single night in the history of Latin Music. Categories: Best Tropical Album "Ironia", Best Traditional Tropical Album "Ironia", and Best Tropical Song "Que Ironia".
Honored by the Mayor of Yonkers, New York, Philip A. Amicone in 2006.
2006 In Mexico he was nominated for Best New Artist for the Premios Oye.
7 Premio Lo Nuestro nominations: 
2004, One Nomination for "Best Traditional Tropical Artist" for his album Necesito Un Amor
2005, Three Nominations for "Best Tropical Album", "Best Traditional Tropical Artist" and "Best Tropical Song" categories for his album "Ironia".
2006, Two Nominations for Best Tropical Male Artist and Best Traditional Tropical Artist, for his concept album “My Life,”
2009, Andy Andy was nominated once again for "Premio Lo Nuestro" as "Best Traditional Tropical Artist.”

2010, Honored by the New York Senator Jose Peralta.
July 4, 2011, Andy Andy released his new single "Mi Alma Loca" reaching the Top 10 of the Latin Tropical Billboard in the just 2 weeks.
September 4, 2011, Andy Andy received a key to the city from Mayor Robert Romano and declared the date of September 4, 2011 as the day of Andy Andy to honor his successful.
2012, Andy Andy recorded a new album in the Dominican Republic.
April 10, 2013, Andy Andy, Olga Tañon and Alvaro Torres were guest artists to sing in front of the National Capitol Building in Washington, DC.

Discography
 Por Una Mujer (1997)
 Cójele el Swing (1998)
 Justo a Tiempo (2000)
 Aquí Conmigo (2002)
 Necesito Un Amor (2003)
 Ironía (2005)
 Tú Me Haces Falta (2007)
 Mi Música... Dos Tiempos (2008)
 Placer y Castigo (2009)
 El Cariño Es Como Una Flor(2012)
 Soy De Llorar (2013)
 Es Mejor Decir Adios (2014)
 Vive Tu Vida (2015)
 Yo Te Amo (2015)
 Amor Eterno Homenaje (2016)
 Un Hombre Nuevo (2017)
 Sigo Siendo El Dueńo (2017)
 Adios Amor (2018)
 Tontos y Locos (2019)
 Lazaro (2020)

Compilations
 My Life (2006)
 10 de Colección (2007)

References

External links
 Andyandymusic.com

Bachata musicians
Living people
21st-century Dominican Republic male singers
EMI Televisa Music artists
Sony Discos artists
Year of birth missing (living people)
Dominican Republic male songwriters
Spanish-language singers
Dominican Republic musicians
20th-century Dominican Republic male singers